Frank Philip Stella (born May 12, 1936) is an American painter, sculptor and printmaker, noted for his work in the areas of minimalism and post-painterly abstraction. Stella lives and works in New York City.

Biography
Frank Stella was born in Malden, Massachusetts, to parents of Italian descent. His father was a gynecologist, and his mother was a housewife and artist who attended fashion school and later took up landscape painting.

After attending high school at Phillips Academy in Andover, Massachusetts, where he learned about abstract modernists Josef Albers and Hans Hofmann, he attended Princeton University, where he majored in history and met Darby Bannard and Michael Fried. Early visits to New York art galleries fostered his artistic development, and his work was influenced by the abstract expressionism of Jackson Pollock and Franz Kline. Stella moved to New York in 1958, after his graduation. He is heralded for creating abstract paintings that bear no pictorial illusions or psychological or metaphysical references in twentieth-century painting.
 	
In the 1970s he moved into NoHo in Manhattan in New York City. As of 2015, Stella lived in Greenwich Village and kept an office there but commuted on weekdays to his studio in Rock Tavern, New York.

Work

Late 1950s and early 1960s

Upon moving to New York City, he reacted against the expressive use of paint by most painters of the abstract expressionist movement, instead finding himself drawn towards the "flatter" surfaces of Barnett Newman's work and the "target" paintings of Jasper Johns. He began to produce works which emphasized the picture-as-object, rather than the picture as a representation of something, be it something in the physical world, or something in the artist's emotional world. Stella married Barbara Rose, later a well-known art critic, in 1961. Around this time he said that a picture was "a flat surface with paint on it – nothing more". This was a departure from the technique of creating a painting by first making a sketch. Many of the works are created by simply using the path of the brush stroke, very often using common house paint.

This new aesthetic found expression in a series of new paintings, the Black Paintings (1959) in which regular bands of black paint were separated by very thin pinstripes of unpainted canvas. Die Fahne Hoch! (1959) is one such painting. It takes its name ("The Raised Banner" in English) from the first line of the Horst-Wessel-Lied, the anthem of the National Socialist German Workers Party, and Stella pointed out that it is in the same proportions as banners used by that organization. It has been suggested that the title has a double meaning, referring also to Jasper Johns' paintings of flags. In any case, its emotional coolness belies the contentiousness its title might suggest, reflecting this new direction in Stella's work. Stella's art was recognized for its innovations before he was twenty-five. In 1959, several of his paintings were included in "Three Young Americans" at the Allen Memorial Art Museum at Oberlin College, as well as in "Sixteen Americans" at the Museum of Modern Art in New York (60).

From 1960 Stella began to produce paintings in aluminium and copper paint which, in their presentation of regular lines of color separated by pinstripes, are similar to his black paintings. However they use a wider range of colors, and are his first works using shaped canvases (canvases in a shape other than the traditional rectangle or square), often being in L, N, U or T-shapes. These later developed into more elaborate designs, in the Irregular Polygon series (67), for example.

Also in the 1960s, Stella began to use a wider range of colors, typically arranged in straight or curved lines. Later he began his Protractor Series (71) of paintings, in which arcs, sometimes overlapping, within square borders are arranged side by side to produce full and half circles painted in rings of concentric color. These paintings are named after circular cities he had visited while in the Middle East earlier in the 1960s. The Irregular Polygon canvases and Protractor series further extended the concept of the shaped canvas.

Late 1960s and early 1970s

Stella began his extended engagement with printmaking in the mid-1960s, working first with master printer Kenneth Tyler at Gemini G.E.L. Stella produced a series of prints during the late 1960s starting with a print called Quathlamba I in 1968. Stella's abstract prints used lithography, screenprinting, etching and offset lithography.

In 1967, he designed the set and costumes for Scramble, a dance piece by Merce Cunningham. The Museum of Modern Art in New York presented a retrospective of Stella's work in 1970, making him the youngest artist to receive one. During the following decade, Stella introduced relief into his art, which he came to call "maximalist" painting for its sculptural qualities. The shaped canvases took on even less regular forms in the Eccentric Polygon series, and elements of collage were introduced, pieces of canvas being pasted onto plywood, for example. His work also became more three-dimensional to the point where he started producing large, free-standing metal pieces, which, although they are painted upon, might well be considered sculpture. After introducing wood and other materials in the Polish Village series (73), created in high relief, he began to use aluminum as the primary support for his paintings. As the 1970s and 1980s progressed, these became more elaborate and exuberant. Indeed, his earlier Minimalism [more] became baroque, marked by curving forms, Day-Glo colors, and scrawled brushstrokes. Similarly, his prints of these decades combined various printmaking and drawing techniques. In 1973, he had a print studio installed in his New York house. In 1976, Stella was commissioned by BMW to paint a BMW 3.0 CSL for the second installment in the BMW Art Car Project. He has said of this project, "The starting point for the art cars was racing livery. In the old days there used to be a tradition of identifying a car with its country by color. Now they get a number and they get advertising. It's a paint job, one way or another. The idea for mine was that it's from a drawing on graph paper. The graph paper is what it is, a graph, but when it's morphed over the car's forms it becomes interesting, and adapting the drawing to the racing car's forms is interesting. Theoretically it's like painting on a shaped canvas."

In 1969, Stella was commissioned to create a logo for the Metropolitan Museum of Art Centennial. Medals incorporating the design were struck to mark the occasion.

1980s and afterward

From the mid-1980s to the mid-1990s, Stella created a large body of work that responded in a general way to Herman Melville’s Moby-Dick. During this time, the increasingly deep relief of Stella's paintings gave way to full three-dimensionality, with sculptural forms derived from cones, pillars, French curves, waves, and decorative architectural elements. To create these works, the artist used collages or maquettes that were then enlarged and re-created with the aids of assistants, industrial metal cutters, and digital technologies.  La scienza della pigrizia (The Science of Laziness), from 1984, is an example of Stella's transition from two-dimensionality to three-dimensionality.  It is fabricated from oil paint, enamel paint, and alkyd paint on canvas, etched magnesium, aluminum and fiberglass.

In the 1990s, Stella began making free-standing sculpture for public spaces and developing architectural projects. In 1993, for example, he created the entire decorative scheme for Toronto’s Princess of Wales Theatre, which includes a 10,000-square-foot mural. His 1993 proposal for a Kunsthalle and garden in Dresden did not come to fruition. In 1997, he painted and oversaw the installation of the 5,000-square-foot "Stella Project" which serves as the centerpiece of the theater and lobby of the Moores Opera House located at the Rebecca and John J. Moores School of Music on the campus of the University of Houston, in Houston, TX. His aluminum bandshell, inspired by a folding hat from Brazil, was built in downtown Miami in 2001; a monumental Stella sculpture was installed outside the National Gallery of Art in Washington, D.C.

Stella's wall-hung Scarlatti K Series was triggered by the harpsichord sonatas of Domenico Scarlatti and the writings of the U.S. 20th-century harpsichord virtuoso and musicologist Ralph Kirkpatrick, who made the sonatas widely known. (The title's "K" refers to Kirkpatrick's chronology numbers.) Scarlatti wrote more than 500 keyboard sonatas; Stella's series today includes about 150 works.

From 1978 to 2005, Stella owned the Van Tassell and Kearney Horse Auction Mart building in Manhattan's East Village and used it as his studio. His nearly 30-year stewardship of the building resulted in the facade being cleaned and restored. After a six-year campaign by the Greenwich Village Society for Historic Preservation, in 2012 the historic building was designated a New York City Landmark. After 2005, Stella split his time between his West Village apartment and his Newburgh, New York studio.

By the turn of the 2010s, Stella started using the computer as a painterly tool to produce stand-alone stars-shaped sculptures. The resulting stars are often monochrome, black or beige or naturally metallic, and their points can take the form of solid planes, spindly lines or wire-mesh circuits. His Jasper’s Split Star (2017), a sculpture constructed out of six small geometric grids that rest on an aluminum base, was installed at 7 World Trade Center in 2021.

Artists' rights
Stella had been an advocate of strong copyright protection for artists such as himself. On June 6, 2008, Stella (with Artists Rights Society president Theodore Feder; Stella is a member artist of the Artists Rights Society) published an Op-Ed for The Art Newspaper decrying a proposed U.S. Orphan Works law which "remove[s] the penalty for copyright infringement if the creator of a work, after a diligent search, cannot be located".

In the Op-Ed, Stella wrote,

Gallery of works

Exhibitions
Stella's work was included in several exhibitions in the 1960s, among them the Solomon R. Guggenheim Museum’s The Shaped Canvas (1965) and Systemic Painting (1966). The Museum of Modern Art in New York presented a retrospective of Stella's work in 1970. His art has since been the subject of several retrospectives in the United States, Europe, and Japan. In 2012, a retrospective of Stella's career was shown at the Kunstmuseum Wolfsburg.

Selected solo exhibitions 

Solomon R. Guggenheim Museum, "The Shaped Canvas," New York, NY, December 9–January 3, 1964
Museum of Modern Art, "Frank Stella," New York, NY, March 26–May 31, 1970
Phillips Collection, "Frank Stella," Washington, D.C., November 3–December 2, 1973
Baltimore Museum of Art, "Frank Stella: The Black Paintings," Baltimore, MD, November 23, 1976 – January 23, 1977
Fort Worth Art Museum, "Stella Since 1970," Fort Worth, TX, March 19–April 30, 1978
The Museum of Modern Art, "Frank Stella: The Indian Bird Maquettes," New York, NY, March 12–May 1, 1979
Jewish Museum (Manhattan), "Frank Stella. Polish Wooden Synagogues –Constructions from the 1970s," New York, NY, February 9–May 1, 1983
San Francisco Museum of Modern Art, "Resource / Response / Reservoir. Stella Survey 1959-1982," San Francisco, CA, March 10–May 1, 1983
Fogg Art Museum, Harvard University Art Museum, "Frank Stella: Selected Works," Cambridge, MA, December 7, 1983 – January 26, 1984
The Museum of Modern Art, "Frank Stella: 1970-1987," New York, NY, October 10, 1987 – January 5, 1988
Waddington Galleries, "Frank Stella," London, UK, March 29–April 20, 2000
San Francisco Museum of Modern Art, "What You See Is What You See: Frank Stella and the Anderson Collection at SFMOMA," San Francisco, CA, June 11–September 6, 2004
Arthur M. Sackler Museum, Harvard Art Museums, "Frank Stella 1958," Cambridge, MA, February 4–May 7, 2006
Metropolitan Museum of Art, "Frank Stella: Painting into Architecture," New York, NY, May 1–July 19, 2007
Neue Nationalgalerie, "Stella & Calatrava. The Michael Kohlhass Curtain," Berlin, Germany, April 15–August 14, 2011
The Phillips Collection, "Stella Sounds: The Scarlatti K Series," Washington, D.C., June 11 –September 4, 2011
Kunstmuseum Wolfsburg, "Frank Stella. The Retrospective. Works 1958-2012," Wolfsburg, Germany, September 8, 2012 – January 20, 2013
Royal Academy of Arts, Annenberg Courtyard, "Inflated Star and Wood Star," London, UK, February 18–May 17, 2015
Whitney Museum of American Art, "Frank Stella: A Retrospective," New York, NY, October 30, 2015 – February 7, 2016
POLIN Museum of the History of Polish Jews, "Frank Stella and the Synagogues of Old Poland," Warsaw, Poland, February 18–June 20, 2016
NSU Museum of Art Fort Lauderdale, "Frank Stella: Experiment and Change," Fort Lauderdale, FL, November 11, 2017 – July 29, 2018
Los Angeles County Museum of Art, "Frank Stella: Selection from the Permanent Collection," Los Angeles, CA, May 5–September 2, 2019
Marianne Boesky Gallery, "Frank Stella: Recent Work," New York, NY, April 25–May 31, 2019

Collections
In 2014, Stella gave his sculpture Adjoeman (2004) as a long-term loan to Cedars-Sinai Medical Center in Los Angeles. The Menil Collection, Houston; the Museum of Fine Arts, Houston; the Hirshhorn Museum and Sculpture Garden, Washington, D.C.; San Francisco Museum of Modern Art; National Gallery of Art; the Toledo Museum of Art and the Whitney Museum of American Art, New York; the Portland Art Museum, Oregon; and many others.

Recognition
Among the many honors he has received was an invitation from Harvard University to give the Charles Eliot Norton Lectures in 1984. Calling for a rejuvenation of abstraction by achieving the depth of baroque painting, these six talks were published by Harvard University Press in 1986 under the title Working Space.

In 2009, Frank Stella was awarded the National Medal of Arts by President Barack Obama. In 2011, he received the Lifetime Achievement Award in Contemporary Sculpture by the International Sculpture Center. In 1996 he received an honorary Doctorate from the University of Jena in Jena, (Germany), where his large sculptures of the "Hudson River Valley Series" are on permanent display, becoming the second artist to receive this honorary degree after Auguste Rodin in 1906.

Art market 
Since 2014, Stella has been represented worldwide in an exclusive arrangement shared by Dominique Lévy and Marianne Boesky. In May 2019, Christie's set an auction record for Stella's Point of Pines, which sold for $28 million.

In April 2021, his Scramble: Ascending Spectrum/ascending Green Values (1977) was sold for £2.4 million ($3.2 million with premium)in London. The painting was bought for $1.9 million in 2006 from the collection of Belgian art patrons Roger and Josette Vanthournout at Sotheby’s.

Personal life 
From 1961-1969 Stella was married to art historian Barbara Rose; they had two children, Rachel and Michael. In 1978 he married pediatrician Harriet McGurk.

Selected bibliography
 Julia M. Busch: A decade of sculpture: the 1960s, Associated University Presses, Plainsboro, 1974;  
 Frank Stella and Siri Engberg: Frank Stella at Tyler Graphics, Walker Art Center, Minneapolis, 1997; 
 Frank Stella and Franz-Joachim Verspohl: The Writings of Frank Stella.
 Andrianna Campbell, Kate Nesin, Lucas Blalock, Terry Richardson: Frank Stella, Phaidon, London, 2017;

Non-Fungible Tokens 
In late 2022, Stella launched an NFT (non-fungible token) that includes the right to the CAD files to 3D print the art works in the NFTs.

References

External links 
Frank Stella works at the National Gallery of Art
Unbounded Doctrine: Encountering the Art-Making Career of Frank Stella ArtsEditor.com, December 29, 2015.
Frank Stella in the National Gallery of Australia's Kenneth Tyler Collection
Word Symbol Space An exhibition featuring work by Frank Stella at The Jewish Museum, NY.

Frank Stella interviewed by Robert Ayers, March 2009
Works of art, auction & sale results, exhibitions, and artist information for Frank Stella on artnet
Guggenheim Museum online Biography of Frank Stella
Stella's work in the Guggenheim Collection 
Stella mural installation, Princess of Wales Theatre, Toronto
Frank Stella: An Illustrated Biography by Sidney Guberman
Frank Stella Papers at the Smithsonian's Archives of American Art
Frank Stella: Scarlatti and Bali Sculpture Series / Paracelsus Building, St. Moritz. Video at VernissageTV.
Frank Stella 1958 poet William Corbett writes about the exhibition titled Frank Stella 1958 at the Arthur M. Sackler Museum, Harvard University Cambridge, Massachusetts February 4 – May 7, 2006
Laying the Tracks Others Followed; Early Work at L&M Arts; The New York Times; Roberta Smith; April 26, 2012
Frank Stella in the Guggenheim collection

20th-century American painters
American male painters
21st-century American painters
20th-century American sculptors
20th-century American male artists
21st-century American sculptors
21st-century American male artists
American male sculptors
American abstract artists
American contemporary painters
American muralists
Minimalist artists
Abstract painters
Modern painters
1936 births
Living people
Painters from New York City
Painters from Massachusetts
People from Greenwich Village
Art Students League of New York people
Phillips Academy alumni
Princeton University alumni
American people of Italian descent
People from Malden, Massachusetts
United States National Medal of Arts recipients
20th-century American printmakers
Honorary Members of the Royal Academy
Sculptors from New York (state)
Sculptors from Massachusetts
Members of the Royal Swedish Academy of Arts